is a railway station in Nagoya, Aichi Prefecture, Japan. The station is a concentrated terminal operated by Central Japan Railway Company (JR Central), Nagoya Railroad (Meitetsu), and Nagoya Municipal Subway, and is the main access terminal to Chūbu Centrair International Airport, and provides access to Nagoya/Boston Museum of Fine Arts.

Meitetsu Kanayama Station 

Meitetsu Kanayama station is the oldest of the three stations that make up Kanayama Station, having been operating since 1 September 1944. Originally it was known as Kanayamabashi Station.

Layout 
There are three wickets, namely the West Wicket, Central Wicket, and East Wicket. There is also a special wicket that allows transfers between JR and Meitetsu Lines.

Platforms 
There are two island platforms serving four tracks.

JR Central Kanayama Station 

JR Central Kanayama Station is one of the stations within Kanayama Station, and the second one to have been opened, on 25 January 1962, after Meitetsu Kanayama. It is a main stop on the Chūō Main Line and the Tōkaidō Main Line. On the Tōkaidō Main Line, there is a rapid train known as the Home Liner, and on the Chūō Main Line, there is a rapid train known as the Central Liner. There is a special wicket that allows passengers to transfer from JR lines to Meitetsu lines, which is possible because the Meitetsu tracks are within the JR tracks. There is also a staffed ticket office.

Station numbering was introduced to the sections of the Tōkaidō and Chuo Lines operated JR Central in March 2018; Kanayama Station was assigned station number CA66 for the Tōkaidō Line and CF01 for the Chuo Line.

Lines 
Tōkaidō Main Line
Chūō Main Line
for Nagoya

Layout

Platforms 

There are two physical platforms for four lines. The two physical platforms straddle the platforms of Meitetsu Kanayama, which are sandwiched in the middle. Platforms 1 and 2 are for the Chūō Line, with Platform 1 serving trains bound for Tajimi Station and Platform 2 serving trains bound for Nagoya Station. Platforms 3 and 4 are for the Tōkaidō Line, with Platform 3 serving trains bound for Toyohashi Station and Platform 4 serving trains bound for Nagoya Station.

The station is completely accessible inside the gates for passengers with disabilities.

Nagoya Municipal Subway Kanayama Station 

The subway portion of Kanayama Station opened on 30 March 1967 as a stop on the Meijō Line and Meikō Line.

Lines 
 (Station Number: M01)
 (Station Number: E01)

Layout

Platforms

There are four platforms. Platforms 3 and 4, on one physical platform, both serve trains bound for Sakae Station and Ōzone Station. The other physical platform has trains bound for Nagoyakō Station on Platform 2 and trains bound for Aratama-bashi Station on Platform 1.

See also 
 List of railway stations in Japan

References

External links 

 Nagoya Transportation Bureau's page on Kanayama Subway Station 
 Asunal Kanayama (shopping and dining) 

Atsuta-ku, Nagoya
Railway stations in Japan opened in 1967
Railway stations in Japan opened in 1944
Railway stations in Japan opened in 1962
Railway stations in Nagoya
Stations of Central Japan Railway Company
Chūō Main Line